Monoon coffeoides is a species of plant in the Annonaceae family. It is a synonym of Polyalthia coffeoides and found in southern India and Sri Lanka.

Uses
Fruit - edible for langurs and other fruit bats.

Culture
Known as "ඕමාර - omara" in Sinhala Language.

References

External links

 http://www.biotik.org/india/species/p/polycoff/polycoff_en.html
 http://indiabiodiversity.org/species/show/17335
 http://www.theplantlist.org/tpl/record/kew-2406952
 http://hub.hku.hk/handle/10722/40137
 https://www.researchgate.net/publication/227340167_Reproductive_biology_of_two_sympatric_species_of_Polyalthia_(Annonaceae)_in_Sri_Lanka._II._Breeding_systems_and_population_genetic_structure

Flora of Sri Lanka
Flora of India (region)
coffeoides